Wilhelm "Willy" Kreitz (21 September 1903 – 3 July 1982) was a Belgian ice hockey player and sculptor.

Career as sportsman 

He won two medals at the Ice Hockey European Championships in 1924 and 1927, and finished 5th and 13th at the 1928 and 1936 Winter Olympics, respectively. He was also present at the 1924 Olympics as a substitute player. At the 1927 European Championships Kreitz was the team captain and top scorer (7 goals in 5 games), and was selected as best player of the tournament.

Career as artist 

Kreitz studied traditional sculpture at the Royal Academy of Fine Arts in Antwerp and created statues and portrait busts for numerous public spaces in Belgium and the Netherlands. He won the Van Leriusprijs and the  Prixe de Rome (1932), and took part in the art competitions at the 1936 Summer Olympics. After that he taught sculpture at the Antwerp Academy.

References 

1903 births
1982 deaths
Ice hockey players at the 1928 Winter Olympics
Ice hockey players at the 1936 Winter Olympics
Olympic ice hockey players of Belgium
Belgian sculptors
Sportspeople from Antwerp
Olympic competitors in art competitions
Belgian ice hockey right wingers